The 1995 UCI Track Cycling World Cup Classics is a multi race tournament over a season of track cycling. The World Cup is organised by the UCI. The events were held in Athens (19–21 May), Cottbus (9–11 June), Adelaide (13–15 July), Tokyo (18–20 July), Manchester (25–27 August) and Quito (15–17 September).

Results

Men

Women

References
Adelaide, Australia results July 13-15
Round 1, Cali, partial results
Some results & venue details

Women's results from wiki in Catalan (matched existing partial results in English)

World Cup Classics
UCI Track Cycling World Cup
20th century in Cottbus